Fazal Niazai (born 1 February 1990) is an Afghan cricketer. He made his international debut for the Afghanistan cricket team in September 2019. He is a right-handed batsman who bowls right-arm medium pace.

Domestic career
Niyazai made his Twenty20 debut for the Afghan Cheetahs in the Faysal Bank Twenty-20 Cup against Faisalabad Wolves.  He played a further match in that competition, against Multan Tigers.  In these two matches, he scored a total of 24 with a high score of 21. He made his first-class debut for Afghanistan against Kenya in the 2011–13 ICC Intercontinental Cup on 6 October 2013.

In September 2018, he was named in Nangarhar's squad in the first edition of the Afghanistan Premier League tournament.

International career
In August 2019, he was named in Afghanistan's Twenty20 International (T20I) squad for the 2019–20 Bangladesh Tri-Nation Series. He made his T20I debut for Afghanistan, against Zimbabwe, on 20 September 2019.

References

External links
 

1990 births
Living people
Afghan cricketers
Afghanistan Twenty20 International cricketers
Place of birth missing (living people)
Afghan Cheetahs cricketers
Nangarhar Leopards cricketers